Orange Blossoms is a 1922 musical comedy with music by Victor Herbert, lyrics by Buddy DeSylva, and a book by Fred de Gresac, based on her own 1902 French play La Passerelle which had also been translated and staged on Broadway in 1903 as The Marriage of Kitty.

It ran for 95 performances at the Fulton Theatre on Broadway between September 19 and December 9, 1922. Produced and directed by Edward Royce, the cast included Alta King, Pat Somerset, Queenie Smith, Edith Day, Hal Skelly, Nancy Welford, and Jack Whiting. The setting is contemporary France with the action taking place in Paris and Cannes.

Synopsis 
Baron Roger Belmont's aunt has recently died, leaving him her inheritance is he marries within a year of her death. He is in love with Helene de Vasquez, but is unable to marry her as his aunt's will specifies he cannot marry a divorcee. His lawyer, Tillie Jones, suggests Belmont enter into a marriage of convenience with her niece Kitty, allowing him to receive his full inheritance before divorcing Kitty and marrying Helene. However, Belmont and Kitty do end up falling in love.

Productions 
Although the Broadway production closed after three months, unable to recoup its investment, the show went on to tour, first stopping for two weeks at the Colonial Theatre in Boston.

In 2014 the Light Opera of New York put on a revival of the show, with revised lyrics by Michael Phillips and Cynthia Edwards, and orchestra reconstructions by Brian Kerns and Christian Smythe. The revised production had only two acts, instead of the original three.

The Victor Herbert Renaissance Project put on a production of the show in 2018.

Cast

Songs

Act l 

 Opening
 This Time It's Love
 A Kiss in the Dark
 New York Is the Same Old Place
 Then Comes the Dawning
 I Can't Argue With You
 In Hennequeville
 A Kiss in the Dark (reprise)

Act ll 

 On the Riviera
 The Lonely Nest
 I Missed You
 Just Like That
 Orange Blossoms

Act lll 

 Mosquito Ballet
 Way Out West in Jersey
 Let's Not Get Married
 This Time It's Love (reprise)
 Finale

Reception 
The show was generally well-received, with positive reviews from the Brooklyn Daily Eagle, Brooklyn Life, the Los Angeles Times, the New York Evening World, the New York Herald, the New York Journal, the New York Telegraph, and the New York Times.

External links 

 Orange Blossoms full book

References 

1922 musicals
Broadway musicals
Compositions by Victor Herbert
Musicals based on plays

Plays set in France